Etlan is an unincorporated community in Madison County, Virginia, United States. It is located near Old Rag Mountain.

Etlan Virginia is a small community composed mostly of agricultural businesses to include wineries. The community and its scenery is inspiring and there are a number of bed and breakfasts to accommodate visitors.

References

External links
 Etlan Community Website

Unincorporated communities in Virginia
Unincorporated communities in Madison County, Virginia